The 35th Indian Brigade was an infantry brigade of the British Indian Army that saw active service with the Indian Army during the First World War.  It took part in the Mesopotamian campaign and was disbanded shortly after the end of the war.  It was not reformed for the Second World War.

History
7th (Meerut) Division
The 35th Indian Brigade was formed in December 1915 and arrived in Mesopotamia in the same month.  It was attached to the 7th (Meerut) Division until February 1916.  While with the division, it took part in the attempts to relieve the 6th (Poona) Division besieged in Kut, including the Action of Shaikh Saad (6 – 8 January 1916), the Action of the Wadi (13 January 1916) and the First attack on Hanna (21 January 1916).
14th Indian Division
In May 1916, the brigade joined the newly formed 14th Indian Division.  It remained with the division for the rest of the war and took part in a large number of small actions: the Advance to the Hai and Capture of the Khudaira Bend (14 December 1916 – 19 January 1917),  the Capture of the Hai Salient (25 January – 5 February 1917), the Capture of the Dahra Bend (9 – 16 February), the Capture of Sannaiyat (17 – 24 February), the Passage of the Tigris (23 – 24 February), the Passage of the Adhaim (18 April), the action of Adhaim (30 April), the Second Action of Jabal Hamrin (16 – 20 October), and the Third Action of Jabal Hamrin (3 – 6 December 1917).

At the end of the war, the 14th Division was rapidly demobilized and the 35th Indian Brigade was broken up in February 1919.

Order of battle
The brigade had the following composition in the First World War:
 1/5th (The Weald of Kent) Battalion, Buffs (East Kent Regiment) (left the Jubbulpore Brigade, 5th (Mhow) Division in November 1915 to join the brigade; remained with the brigade throughout)
 37th Dogras (joined in December 1915 from 5th (Jhelum) Brigade, 2nd (Rawalpindi) Division; remained with the brigade throughout)
 97th Deccan Infantry (left the Derajat Brigade in November 1915 to join the brigade; transferred to Corps Troops in June 1916)
 102nd King Edward's Own Grenadiers (left the Poona Brigade, 6th Poona Divisional Area in November 1915 to join the brigade; remained with the brigade throughout except for a detachment to Corps Troops from May to December 1916)
 Composite Territorial Battalion (formed 12 February 1916, broken up May 1916)
 Composite Dogra Battalion (formed February 1916, broken up June 1916)
 1/4th Battalion, Hampshire Regiment (reformed from the Composite Territorial Battalion in May 1916; transferred to Corps Troops in July)
 3rd Brahmans (attached from Corp Troops from May to December 1916)
 2nd Battalion, 4th Gurkha Rifles (joined from 41st Indian Brigade in June 1916; left in September 1918 to join the 81st Brigade in the British 27th Division)
 185th Machine Gun Company (joined in August 1916)
 35th Light Trench Mortar Battery ('J' Light Trench Mortar Battery joined 14th Division in September 1917 and assigned to the brigade in February 1918)

Commanders
The brigade had the following commanders:

See also

Notes

References

Bibliography

External links
 

Brigades of India in World War I
Military units and formations established in 1915
Military units and formations disestablished in 1919